Harry Lester (8 September 1878 – 14 July 1956), born Maryan Czajkowski in Poland, best known by his stage name The Great Lester, was a seminal vaudeville ventriloquist.

Ventriloquist act
Lester claimed to have carved his dummy, Frank Byron Jr., himself when he was young. Coronet cited Frank Marshall of Chicago as his carver. The most likely provenance of Frank Byron Jr., however, indicates that he came from the Chicago workshop of Theo Mack & Son, probably a number of years before Frank Marshall was employed there.

Called the "Grandfather of Modern-Day Ventriloquism", Lester claimed to be the first to drink while his dummy spoke; however, Joe Laurie notes that this trick was first performed in 1821.

One of Lester's most noted acts was a bit where he called up Heaven and Hell in search of his sister. He was also the first ventriloquist to walk among the audience while his dummy whistled.

Legacy
Lester was also a noted teacher of the art of ventriloquism, having developed a rigorous program of breathing and speech articulation exercises. Students were encouraged to make tape recordings of their sessions with Lester and, as a result, there are many examples of his course to be heard and a number of student recordings have been made available commercially. Edgar Bergen, one of the most famous ventriloquists of all time, was one of the Great Lester's pupils.

Lester's main figure, Frank Byron Jr., now resides at Vent Haven Museum in Fort Mitchell, Kentucky.

Notes

References

Laurie, Joe Jr. Vaudeville: From the Honky-tonks to the Palace. New York: Henry Holt, 1953. p. 80, 254.

External links

Lester gallery, audio and video recordings at VentriloquistCentral.com
Only TV appearance of Lester You Asked For It 27 September 1951 (Windows Media format)
Harry "The Great" Lester Gallery at Vent Haven Museum
Vaudeville Vent – 'The Great' LESTER: 'Grandfather' of Modern Day Ventriloquism at TalkingComedy.com

1878 births
1956 deaths
Vaudeville performers
Ventriloquists
Polish emigrants to the United States